David James Duguid (born 8 October 1970) is a Scottish Conservative politician who has been the Member of Parliament (MP) for Banff and Buchan since June 2017. Duguid's victory marked the end of 30 years of Scottish National Party (SNP) representation in the seat.

Duguid served as Parliamentary Under-Secretary of State for Scotland from September to October 2022. He previously served in this role from June 2020 to September 2021.

Background
He was educated at Banff Academy and Robert Gordon University, where he studied chemistry. Before entering politics, Duguid worked as an engineer for BP and as a project manager for Hitachi Consulting.

Political career
Duguid was first elected in 2017, beating the incumbent, Eilidh Whiteford by over 2,000 votes. His win saw the largest overturned majority of the election night in the UK. He was re-elected with an increased majority and over 50% of the vote in the December 2019 election.

In June 2020, Duguid accepted a position as Parliamentary Under-Secretary of State for Scotland and a Government whip, succeeding Douglas Ross.

Duguid left the government in September 2021 and was appointed Fisheries Envoy.

Duguid and Alister Jack were the only two Scottish Conservative MPs (out of six) who voted in support of Boris Johnson in the  June 2022 confidence vote. Duguid later resigned as Trade Envoy on 6 July 2022.

References

External links

1970 births
Living people
UK MPs 2017–2019
Scottish Conservative Party MPs
People educated at Banff Academy
Alumni of Robert Gordon University
People from Aberdeenshire
UK MPs 2019–present